DailyLit is an online publisher founded in 2006 by Susan Danziger and Albert Wenger. The site distributes stories in serial installments via e-mail and RSS feed. The installments are designed to be read in under five minutes.

The first stories released through DailyLit were Pride and Prejudice and The War of the Worlds.

In 2009, the DailyLit founders launched an industry group called the Digital Publishing Group. Its aim was to help publishers access and use digital tools more effectively.

At the TOC Conference in 2013, it was announced that DailyLit would begin a new partnership with Plympton, a literary studio that publishes serialized fiction for digital platforms. DailyLit founders Susan Danziger and Albert Wenger became inventors and advisors for the newly merged company. It was also announced that the WinkPoke short story series would be the first new installment released on the DailyLit platform.

References

External links
Official website

Online publishing companies of the United States